The SIT Zero Fees Velodrome is an indoor velodrome at Invercargill in the South Island of New Zealand. The $11 million velodrome is an indoor complex next to Stadium Southland, built on the western side of the stadium proper. (The other New Zealand indoor velodrome is the Avantidrome, at Cambridge, in the North Island of the country).

The facility was also the home for the Southern Steel netball side and Southland Sharks basketball team from 2011 to 2013, after the collapse of Stadium Southland in September 2010 during a snow storm.

History 

The 2000 New Zealand Track Championships were held at Kew Bowl and as had happened on previous occasions, weather conditions had a major influence on the meeting. A prominent New Zealand cycling personality made comment on national media questioning why Cycling New Zealand continued to award New Zealand Championship events to Kew Bowl, where weather was often an issue and the bumpy nature of the track was not suited to top competition.

That statement was a catalyst for Cycling Southland to further their plans of establishing New Zealand's first indoor cycling facility.

Many meetings were to follow and it was agreed to commission some professional assistance.  A competitive tendering process was undertaken,  and Australian leisure management company SGL Consulting Group were appointed to conduct a comprehensive feasibility study for the velodrome.  Head of their New Zealand office, Paul MacLennan, who had provided strategic advice in the region previously, on developments such as Stadium Southland, the Southland Aquatic Centre and the Queenstown Recreation Centre, managed the study.

Following extensive consultation, analysis of research into the projected construction and operational costs of such a facility and an assessment of consequential benefits, SGL reported that a cycling velodrome in invercargill may be considered viable when its contribution to community and regional development aspirations were considered.  However, financially , the facility would require support on an ongoing basis. A preferred  site for the new facility was also identified -  adjoining Stadium Southland, as part of the four court extension proposed for that facility.

A community fundraising venture was initiated by Harcourts Real Estate, a longtime supporter of cycling in the south, who were keen to ensure that the Velodrome became an integral part of the Stadium Southland extensions.

Calder Stewart Industries was appointed as the project design and build company and a German Architectural Company, Schuermann Architects were appointed as the Velodrome designer. Negotiations commenced regarding the design and project costs and in August 2005, the groundwork commenced to signal the start of the $8 million project.

A Project Committee, chaired by Mr Ray Harper who had played a significant role in the development of the Stadium Southland building which had been opened in 2000, included Cycling Southland administrators, Stadium Southland Management and other prominent identities, met regularly for a three-year period to ensure the appropriate plans were in place.

In early December 2005, 150 tonnes of track timber and other necessary equipment was shipped out of Hamburg, Germany en route to Port Chalmers, New Zealand, where it duly arrived on 29 January 2006. The six containers were then transported by road to Invercargill and onto the building site at Surrey Park, which now had the walls and roof completed to a sufficient stage to ensure that the building was weather proof. A section of the south wall of the Stadium extension building was left open to allow access for the containers of equipment and once the equipment had arrived, the building was then secured.

Ten German specialist track builders, including the Track Designer, Ralph Schuermann were present when the equipment arrived and work on assembling the 300 track support trusses began immediately. Seventeen local carpenters had been co-opted to assist with the track build and progress on the project was rapid. Once the supporting trusses were in place, the 55 km of surface timber was hand nailed into position, commencing on the inner edge and working concentrically up the track. Some 360,000 nails were used in the project with the Velodrome only taking five weeks to complete.

The extensions features the 250-metre international Velodrome and four court space and also includes an administration block which houses many of Southland's regional sporting organisations, storage, toilets, showers and changing rooms.

The entire project took only 57 weeks to complete and was officially opened on 26 May 2006 by then Prime Minister, Helen Clark.

2012 UCI World Juniors Track Championships 

In 2012 the velodrome hosted the Juniors World Track Cycling Championships. In June 2009, the UCI awarded the 2012 Championships to Invercargill following a joint bid by BikeNZ and Cycling Southland. It was the second time New Zealand had hosted the event which was last held outdoors at Wanganui in 1983.

Olympic Games Training 

The velodrome has been home to the New Zealand Cycling Team since its opening in 2008. New Zealand stars such as Alison Shanks and locals Tom Scully and Eddie Dawkins train at the complex when in New Zealand. The velodrome has also been the centre for the National Championships for the past few years, and was used in build up for the 2008 Olympic Games and 2010 Commonwealth Games.

Previous and Future Events 

2012:

2012 UCI Juniors Track World Championships

2011:

January: Cycling Southland's New Year Cycling Carnival

January: BikeNZ Elite Squad Training (Pre-Beijing World Cup)

February: RaboDirect Elite National Track Cycling Championships

March: RaboDirect Age Group National Track Cycling Championships

March: Bike NZ Elite Squad Training (Pre-World Champs)

March–July: Temporary home for the Southern Steel netball team and Southland Sharks basketball franchises.

June: Harrex Group Corporate Pursuit

November: PowerNet Tour of Southland (Stage starts)

November: Oceania Track Cycling Championships

2010:

January: Cycling Southland's New Year Cycling Carnival

February: RaboPlus Elite National Track Cycling Championships

March: RaboPlus Age Group National Track Cycling Championships

June: Harrex Group Corporate Pursuit

October: OctoberFest Trans Tasman Track Cycling Challenge

November: PowerNet Tour of Southland (2 x Stage Starts)

December: ILT International Festival of Speed

2009:

New Zealand National Championships

2008:

Oceania Continent Cup

Tour of Southland Time Trials

World Championships (Qualifying)

2007:

Under 21 World Championships

Oceania Continent Cup

New Zealand National Championships

Olympic Games Team New Zealand Qualifying

Tour of Southland Time Trials

2006:

Tour of Southland Time Trials

New Zealand National Championships

Commonwealth Games Qualifying champs

New Zealand Under 19 Champs

References

External links
Cycling Southland Site
Calder Stewart Construction - ILT Velodrome Builder
Schuermann Architects - velodrome designers 
SGL Consulting Group - leisure facility planners

2006 establishments in New Zealand
Velodromes in New Zealand
Cycle racing in New Zealand
Southern Steel
Netball venues in New Zealand
Sports venues in New Zealand
Sports venues in Invercargill
2000s architecture in New Zealand